Royal Greenland A/S is a fishing company in Greenland, spun off from Kalaallit Niuerfiat in 1990 but still wholly owned by the Government of Greenland. The company operates in a number of towns and settlements in Greenland, with 20 fish processing plants and ship bases of local subsidiary units. Some of the processing plants were closed between 2007 and 2009. Royal Greenland had an annual net profit of DKK 335 million before tax in 2016.

History 

The Royal Greenland Trading Department was founded in 1774 as a Dano-Norwegian state enterprise charged with administering the Danish settlements and trade in Greenland. The company's monopoly was finally ended in 1950 and the Home Rule Government, introduced in 1979, gained control in 1986, first renaming it "Kalaallit Niuerfiat" and then, in 1992, "KNI". The company's fishing operations were spun off as Royal Greenland A/S in 1990.

See also

 Economy of Greenland, where Royal Greenland's fish make up more than half of all exports
 List of seafood companies

References

External links

Companies based in Nuuk
Food and drink companies established in 1990
Danish brands
Food product brands
Greenlandic brands
Purveyors to the Court of Denmark
Seafood companies of North America
Fishing in Greenland
Food and drink companies of Greenland
Greenlandic companies established in 1990